Zandi is a surname. Notable people with the surname include:

Ferydoon Zandi (born 1979), Iranian-German soccer player
Jalil Zandi, ace fighter pilot in the Islamic Republic of Iran Air Force
Maryam Zandi (born 1947), Iranian photographer
Mona Zandi-Haqiqi, Iranian film director
Roya Zandi, American biophysicist
Zandi family (United States):
Iraj Zandi, Iranian-American professor
Mark Zandi, Iranian-American economist
Zach Zandi, American soccer player

See also
Zand dynasty

Persian-language surnames